The Bishop of Grantham is an episcopal title used by a suffragan bishop of the Church of England Diocese of Lincoln, in the Province of Canterbury, England. The title takes its name after the market town of Grantham in Lincolnshire.

Nicholas Chamberlain was consecrated Bishop of Grantham on 19 November 2015. In 2016, Chamberlain announced he is gay and in a partnership, becoming the first bishop so to do in the Church of England.

List of bishops

References

External links
 Crockford's Clerical Directory - Listings

 
Anglican suffragan bishops in the Diocese of Lincoln
Diocese of Lincoln
Grantham